Gastón Raul González (born 6 October 1996) is an Argentine footballer who plays as a forward.

Career
González, like father and uncle, began his career with Gimnasia y Esgrima. He made his professional debut on 23 April 2017 against Guillermo Brown, being substituted on for the final minutes of a 1–0 defeat in Primera B Nacional. He participated again three months later versus Instituto as the club finished eighteenth in 2016–17. González left Gimnasia y Esgrima on 28 August, signing for Argentino of Primera C Metropolitana. One goal and ten matches followed, with the forward then leaving in December. He had a trial with Italian Prima Categoria side Palestrina in January 2018. In the succeeding July, González joined Juventud Antoniana. He terminated his contract in October.

Personal life
González is the son of Alejandro González, nephew of Fabián González and first cousin of Alfredo González, all three being former professional footballers.

Career statistics
.

References

External links

1996 births
Living people
Sportspeople from Salta Province
Argentine footballers
Association football forwards
Primera Nacional players
Primera C Metropolitana players
Gimnasia y Esgrima de Jujuy footballers
Argentino de Merlo footballers
Juventud Antoniana footballers